Nicholas Alexander Roach (born June 16, 1985) is a former American football linebacker of the National Football League (NFL). He was signed by the San Diego Chargers as an undrafted free agent in 2007. He played college football at Northwestern.

Roach also played for the Chicago Bears and Oakland Raiders.

Early years 
Roach attended high school at Milwaukee Lutheran High School in Milwaukee, Wisconsin where he lettered in football, basketball, and track.

College career 
Roach attended Northwestern (2003–06) where he started 32 career games. He finished his career with 241 tackles, 9.0 sacks, 16 TFLs and 2 interceptions. He was named Academic All-Big Ten and team co-MVP as a senior despite having his season cut short due to a broken leg. He led the Wildcats with 62 tackles despite playing in just eight games in 2006. He was Northwestern’s second-leading tackler as a junior with 77 stops, Roach earned NGN Defensive Newcomer of the Year Award as a sophomore after finishing second on the team with 7.5 TFLs. He played in all 13 games as a freshman.

Professional career

Chicago Bears
Roach went undrafted in 2007 and was signed by the Chicago Bears after being cut from the Chargers. That season, he played in only 3 games, starting none.  In 2008, he saw increased playing time, starting nine games and tallying 28 solo tackles in addition to nine assists.  2009 saw Roach make his biggest impact yet on defense, starting 15 games for the Bears.  He had 54 solo tackles, 28 assists, two sacks and three fumble recoveries.

On March 6, 2011, Roach was a guest on Chalk Them Up Radio to review the Chicago Bears run to the NFC Championship Game.

In 2012, Roach and Stephen Paea were awarded the Brian Piccolo Award.

Oakland Raiders
Roach signed with the Oakland Raiders on March 15, 2013.
Roach played in all 16 games and lead the team in tackles during the 2013 season.

Due to lingering concussion symptoms that involve issues with his balance and vision, the Raiders released him on March 6, 2015.

Personal life
Roach married on February 18, 2012.

References

External links
Nick Roach Website
Oakland Raiders bio
Chicago Bears bio
Northwestern Wildcats bio

1985 births
Living people
Players of American football from Milwaukee
American football linebackers
Northwestern Wildcats football players
San Diego Chargers players
Chicago Bears players
Oakland Raiders players
Ed Block Courage Award recipients
Brian Piccolo Award winners